Michał Czekaj (born 13 February 1992 in Kraków, Poland) is a Polish footballer who plays as a centre-back for Raków Częstochowa II.

Club career
Czekaj began his career when he was 6 years old at Wisła Kraków. In July 2009 he was promoted to Wisła Kraków first team. On 2 August 2009 he played his first match for Wisła Kraków reserve team in Młoda Ekstraklasa.

He made his debut for Wisła Kraków senior team in the Ekstraklasa on 20 August 2011 in a match against Korona Kielce.

International career
Czekaj made his debut for the Poland national under-17 football team on 27 August 2008 in a match against Hungary. He played in all three matches in UEFA European Under-17 Championship elite round. In May 2009 he played for Poland national under-18 football team in two matches against Hungary. On 13 August 2009 he played his first match for Poland national under-19 football team.

Statistics 
 (correct as of 3 November 2012)

References

External links

1992 births
Living people
Polish footballers
Poland youth international footballers
Wisła Kraków players
Rozwój Katowice players
Garbarnia Kraków players
Ekstraklasa players
I liga players
II liga players
III liga players
Footballers from Kraków
Association football defenders